Buttar is a Jat clan. 

Notable people with this surname include:
 Maninder Buttar, Punjabi singer
 Prit Buttar, British military historian
 Rabinder Buttar, British biochemist
 Rashid Buttar, American osteopathic physician
 Vinaypal Buttar, Punjabi actor and singer/songwriter

See also
 Buttar (disambiguation)

References

Surnames
Jat clans
Social groups of Punjab, India
Social groups of Punjab, Pakistan